Casamémoire is a non-profit organization dedicated to the promotion and protection of the 20th-century architecture of Casablanca, Morocco. As of 2015, Casamemoire is an NGO in an official partnership with UNESCO with consultative status.

Jacqueline Alluchon established the organization in 1995 in the aftermath of the destruction of Marius Boyer's Villa Moqri, amid general disinterest among the city's decision-makers. Its objectives are to raise awareness in public opinion and among the city's social and political decision-makers, as well as give value to the city's architectural heritage through the restoration and rehabilitation of historical buildings.

Casamemoire registered its first building, Hotel Lincoln, as architectural heritage in 2000.

Since 2009, Casamémoire has organized Casablanca's Heritage Days: 3 days per year during which volunteer guides offer free guided visits of the city's architecture. The Heritage Days allow the public to discover the architectural treasures of Morocco's economic capital.

List of presidents 

 1995-1998: Amina Alaoui, architect
 1998-2003: Rachid Andaloussi, architect
 2003-2006: Mustapha Chakib, architect
 2006-2012: Abderrahim Kassou, architect
 2012-2019: Rachid Andaloussi, architect
2019–present: Rabia El Ridaoui

References

External links 

 Casamémoire, official website.

Organizations based in Morocco